No. 221 Squadron (Valiants) is an Indian Air Force fighter squadron and is equipped with Su-30MKI and based at Halwara Air Force Station.

History 
The squadron was established as an offensive fighter squadron on 14 February 1963 at Barrackpore. The first commanding officer was Squadron Leader N Chatrath. The squadron was subsequently equipped with Supermarine Spitfire, de Havilland Vampire and Su-7. The squadron has changed many based in the 54 years since its establishment. The Su-7 aircraft saw action in the Indo-Pakistani War of 1971 over Bangladesh. It also participated in the Kargil war with the Mig-23, which were retired in 2009. On 24 April 2017, Su30-MKI aircraft was inducted into the squadron with Wing Commander HS Luthra as the commanding officer. Numerous pilots from the squadron have been decorated with gallantry awards over many years of its operation.

Assignments 
 Indo-Pakistani War of 1971
 Kargil War

Aircraft

References 

220